Pickett is an unincorporated community and census-designated place (CDP) in Pontotoc County, Oklahoma, United States. It was first listed as a CDP prior to the 2020 census.

The CDP is in west-central Pontotoc County, along Oklahoma State Highway 19, which leads east  to Ada, the county seat, and west  to Stratford.

Demographics

References 

Census-designated places in Pontotoc County, Oklahoma
Census-designated places in Oklahoma